David Johansen and the Harry Smiths is a 2000 album that David Johansen released with the "Harry Smiths".  Johansen created the album following a folk scene that was taking place in the late 1990s in New York City clubs.  Inspired by the 1997 reissue of musicologist Harry Everett Smith's Anthology of American Folk Music (a compilation of 1920s  and 1930s country and blues recordings), Johansen named his band "the Harry Smiths" and recorded and performed songs from, or inspired by, the Anthology. The Harry Smiths band included long-time Johansen associate Brian Koonin on guitar and mandolin, with Larry Saltzman also playing guitar and playing banjo. The rhythm section of Kermit Driscoll and Joey Baron played for many years with jazz guitarist Bill Frisell, and both have worked extensively with other jazz artists.

The album was his first since 1984 that is credited to him and not his musical alter ego Buster Poindexter.

Production
The album was recorded at St. Peter's Episcopal Church, in New York City, and was produced by Brian Koonin and Norman Chesky.

Critical reception
Exclaim! though that Johansen's "half-spoken, half-sung style marries beautifully to the front-porch demeanour of these rich samples of the music harvested by the late musicologist." The Chicago Reader wrote that "Johansen delivers even the most morbid lyrics with an offhand ease that gives them the immediacy of nightmares." The Guardian wrote that Johansen's "gruff bellow fits this material like a glove, nowhere better than on the bittersweet 'Delia'."

Track listing

Personnel
David Johansen - vocals, guitar, harmonica
Brian Koonin - guitar, mandolin
Larry Saltzman - guitar, banjo
Kermit Driscoll - bass, didjeridu
Joey Baron - percussion

Additional personnel
David Chesky - producer
Brian Koonin - producer
Norman Chesky - executive producer 
Hank Medress - executive producer
Barry Wolifson - recording engineer
Sandy Palmer Grassi - second engineer/production coordinator
Nicholas Prout - editing and mastering engineer
Rick Eckerle - recording assistant
Peter Volpe - recording assistant
Lisa J. Marks - director of legal affairs
Catherine Kernen - production manager
Lisa Hershfield - artist development
Slow Hearth Studio - art direction

References

2000 albums
David Johansen albums
Chesky Records albums